Angelos Argyris (born 6 May 1994) is a Greek professional footballer who plays as a centre-back for BSV Schwarz-Weiß Rehden.

Career
Argyris made his professional debut in the Superleague Greece for Niki Volos on 13 September 2014, starting in the away match against PAOK, which finished as a 3–0 loss.

References

External links
 
 

1994 births
Living people
Footballers from Volos
Greek footballers
Association football defenders
Niki Volos F.C. players
SV Werder Bremen II players
SC Weiche Flensburg 08 players
Korona Kielce players
VfB Oldenburg players
BSV Schwarz-Weiß Rehden players
Super League Greece players
3. Liga players
Regionalliga players
Greek expatriate footballers
Greek expatriate sportspeople in Germany
Expatriate footballers in Germany
Greek expatriate sportspeople in Poland
Expatriate footballers in Poland